Andonova is a Slavic surname according to Slavic naming conventions.  Notable people with this name include the following:

Lyudmila Andonova (born 1960), Bulgarian high jump athlete
Malena Andonova (born 1957), Bulgarian sprint athlete
Milena Andonova (born 1959), Bulgarian screenwriter and film director
Nataša Andonova (born 1993), Macedonian footballer 
Sijce Andonova (born 1992), Macedonian football

See also

Andonov
Antonova

Patronymic surnames